The 1920–21 season was Manchester United's 25th season in the Football League and 10th in the First Division.

First Division

FA Cup

References

Manchester United F.C. seasons
Manchester United